Albert Lightfoot (born 8 January 1936, in Woore, Shropshire, England) is a former cricketer who played first-class cricket for Northamptonshire from 1953 to 1970.

County career
Lightfoot joined Northamptonshire in 1953, and was awarded his county cap in 1961. He also made First-Class appearances for the Combined Services (in 1955), TN Pearce's XI (1962), a 'Players' team (1962 also), and AER Gilligan's XI (1963). He played 294 First-class matches and also 31 One-Day matches from 1963 up until his retirement, a format he never quite adapted to with bat or ball. Lightfoot bowled for the last time in 1968, before retiring altogether in 1970.

Lightfoot gave valuable service to Northamptonshire for nearly twenty years, before extending his stay at the County Ground as head groundsman between 1973 and 1978. When Lightfoot was signed in 1953, it was principally as a medium-fast bowler, but he soon emerged as a talented left-handed batsmen, with his breakthrough being a maiden century against Surrey at The Oval in 1958, when he helped Raman Subba Row add a record-breaking 376 for the sixth wicket.

However, many Northamptonshire fans who witnessed his career will be quicker to mention the one run that he didn't make rather than the 12,000 that he did. Against Richie Benaud's 1961 Australians, Northamptonshire mounted a spirited challenge after being left to score 198 for victory in two and a half hours, and Lightfoot's gallant half-century helped reduce the target to four runs off the final over. With one ball to go, the scores were level. Alan Davidson bowled to Malcolm Scott who missed, but set off for a bye to acting wicketkeeper Bobby Simpson; Lightfoot, inexplicably, stayed put at the non-striker's end, Scott was run out, and Australia escaped with a draw.

It is possible that Lightfoot stayed in the team at times when his batting average drooped due to his ability to 'bowl a bit'. Despite such droops, particularly in the mid-1960s, he managed some very productive batting seasons, especially 1962 when he scored 1,795 runs for Northamptonshire including five hundreds. He also managed two career-reviving seasons in 1968 and 1969, reaching 1,000 runs in each. In the years in between colleagues felt that it was a lack of 'drive' which held him back. He took a benefit in 1970, having already told the club that he would not be staying in the game for the following season.
(This passage was adapted from the book 100 Greats: Northamptonshire County Cricket Club.)

External links
Cricinfo Profile

1936 births
English cricketers
Northamptonshire cricketers
Living people
Players cricketers
Combined Services cricketers
A. E. R. Gilligan's XI cricketers
T. N. Pearce's XI cricketers